Walking in Space is a 1969 studio album by Quincy Jones.  The album was recorded for A&M who released the album with a cover photo of Jones taken by Pete Turner. Vocalist Valerie Simpson is featured on the title track, an arrangement of a song from the hit rock musical Hair. "Dead End" is also from Hair and "Killer Joe" features Ray Brown on bass and Grady Tate on drums.

Track listing
 "Dead End" (Galt MacDermot, James Rado, Gerome Ragni) – 4:05
 "Walking in Space" (MacDermot, Rado, Ragni) – 12:06 as Hair (Original Broadway Cast Recording)
 "Killer Joe" (Benny Golson) – 5:12
 "Love and Peace" (Arthur Adams) – 5:48
 "I Never Told You" (Arthur Hamilton, Johnny Mandel) – 4:18
 "Oh Happy Day" (Edwin Hawkins) – 3:37

Personnel
 Quincy Jones - conductor, arranger
 Freddie Hubbard, Lloyd Michaels, Dick Williams, John Frosk, Marvin Stamm, Snooky Young – trumpet
 Jimmy Cleveland, J. J. Johnson, Alan Raph, Tony Studd, Norman Pride, Kai Winding – trombone
 Joel Kaye, Roland Kirk, Hubert Laws, Jerome Richardson – reeds
 Paul Griffin - piano
 Eric Gale - electric guitar
 Ray Brown - double bass 
 Grady Tate - drums
 Chuck Rainey - bass on "Love and Peace"
 Bob James - electric piano
 Hubert Laws - flute, tenor sax
 Toots Thielemans - guitar, harmonica
 Bernard Purdie - drums
 Hilda Harris - vocals
 Marilyn Jackson - vocals
 Valerie Simpson - vocal solo on "Walking in Space"
 Maretha Stewart - vocals
Technical
Pete Turner - photography

References

1969 albums
Quincy Jones albums
Albums arranged by Quincy Jones
Albums produced by Creed Taylor
A&M Records albums
Albums conducted by Quincy Jones
Grammy Award for Best Large Jazz Ensemble Album